Mohamed El-Aqabawy (born 3 March 1979) is an Egyptian goalkeeper player.

Honors

Arab Contractors
 Egyptian Cup: the 2003–04
 Egyptian Super Cup: 2004

External links 
 

1979 births
Living people
Zamalek SC players
Association football goalkeepers
Egyptian footballers